Boletus manicus is a species of fungus in the family Boletaceae of mushrooms. Found in the Wahgi valley Papua New Guinea, it was first described by French mycologist Roger Heim in 1963. Heim singled out this mushroom largely because of its similar appearance to Rubroboletus satanas. Reported to be psychoactive, the active principles are thought to be three indolic substances, but their concentration in the mushroom is too low to allow for chemical analysis and identification.

In the Wahgi language it is called gegwantsyi ngimbl. The word ngimbl in the south Wahgi dialect means pain, which describes the intense bitterness of the mushroom.

See also
List of Boletus species

References

manicus
Fungi of New Guinea
Fungi described in 1963